Vasum truncatum is a species of large predatory sea snail, a marine gastropod mollusk within the family Turbinellidae.

Subspecies
 Vasum truncatum triangulare (E. A. Smith, 1902)
 Vasum truncatum truncatum (G. B. Sowerby III, 1892)

Description
The length of the shell attains 71 mm.

(Originally described as Turbinella truncata) The solid, white shell has a subcylindical-turbinate shape. It is truncated and obtusely angulated. The shell contains eight whorls, including two flat, papillate whorls of the protoconch. The anterior portion answering to the rostrum in the typical form as in Turbinella pyrum (Linnaeus, 1767) is quite half as broad as the widest part of the shell, and the anterior part of the elongated, white aperture is so little narrower than the posterior, that it can scarcely be called a siphonal canal. The four small, slightly oblique plaits are situated about (or a little below) the middle of the columella.

Distribution
This marine species occurs off South Africa

References

 Marais J.P. & Kilburn R.N. (2010) Turbinellidae. Pp. 300-310, in: Marais A.P. & Seccombe A.D. (eds), Identification guide to the seashells of South Africa. Volume 1. Groenkloof: Centre for Molluscan Studies. 376 pp.
 Steyn, D. G.; Lussi, M. (2005). Offshore Shells of Southern Africa: A pictorial guide to more than 750 Gastropods. Published by the authors. pp. i–vi, 1–289.

External links
  Abbott, R. T. (1959). The family Vasidae in the Indo-Pacific. Indo-Pacific Mollusca. 1 (1): 15-32

truncatum
Gastropods described in 1892